Miloslav Penner (9 May 1972 – 31 January 2020) was a Czech football defender. He made over 200 appearances in the Czech First League. Penner was known for his unusual hairstyles.

References

External links

1972 births
2020 deaths
Czech footballers
Czech First League players
Place of death missing
SK Dynamo České Budějovice players
1. FK Příbram players
FC Fastav Zlín players
Association football defenders
MFK Karviná players
People from Uherské Hradiště
Sportspeople from the Zlín Region